The Third Indochina War was a series of interconnected armed conflicts, mainly among the various communist factions over strategic influence in Indochina after Communist victory in South Vietnam, Laos and Cambodia in 1975. The conflict primarily started due to continued raids and incursions by the Khmer Rouge into Vietnamese territory that they sought to retake. These incursions would result in the Cambodian–Vietnamese War in which the newly unified Vietnam overthrew the Pol Pot regime and the Khmer Rouge, in turn ending the Cambodian genocide. Vietnam had installed a government led by many opponents of Pol Pot, including former Khmer Rouge most notably Hun Sen. This led to Vietnam's occupation of Cambodia for over a decade. The Vietnamese push to completely destroy the Khmer Rouge led to them conducting border raids in Thailand who had provided sanctuary.

China strongly objected to the invasion of Cambodia. Chinese armed forces launched a punitive operation (Sino-Vietnamese War) in February 1979 and attacked Vietnam's northern provinces, determined to contain Soviet/Vietnamese influence and prevent territorial gains in the region.

In order to acquire full control over Cambodia the People's Army of Vietnam needed to dislodge the remaining Khmer Rouge leaders and units, which had retreated to the remote areas along the Thai-Cambodian border. After the Paris Peace Conference in 1989, the NVA withdrew from Cambodian territory. Finally regular troop engagements in the region ended after the conclusion of the 1991 Paris Peace Accords.

In Laos, an insurgency continued until 2007, with the government being supported by both China and Vietnam.

Background

Soviet-Chinese discord

After Joseph Stalin's death in 1953, Nikita Khrushchev became leader of the Soviet Union. His denouncement of Stalin and his purges, the introduction of more moderate communist policies and foreign policy of peaceful coexistence with the West angered China's leadership. Mao Zedong had been following a strict Stalinistic course, that insisted on the cult of personality as a unifying force of the nation. Disagreements over technical assistance for developing China's nuclear weapons and basic economic policies further alienated the Soviets and the Chinese as opposing forces of communist influence across the globe. As decolonization movements began to pick up speed in the 1960s and many such countries descended into violence, both of the communist powers competed for political control of the various nations or competing factions in ongoing civil war fights. Ever more diverging Chinese and Soviet strategic and political doctrines had increased the Sino-Soviet split of the mid-1950s.

Political developments during the Vietnam War

The Democratic Republic of Vietnam (North Vietnam), which had chosen to ally with the USSR, justified incursions into neighbouring Laos and Cambodia during the Second Indochinese War by reference to the international nature of communist revolution, where "Indochina is a single strategic unit, a single battlefield" and the Vietnam People's Army's pivotal role in bringing this about. However, this internationalism was obstructed by complicated regional historical realities, such as the "timeless oppositions between the Chinese and the Vietnamese on the one hand and the Vietnamese and the Khmers on the other". North Vietnam intervened in the civil war between the Royal Lao Army and the communist Pathet Lao until the establishment of the Lao People's Democratic Republic and the "Treaty of Friendship and Cooperation" signed in July 1977. Permanently stationed North Vietnamese troops secured and maintained vital supply routes and strategic staging sites (Ho Chi Minh trail). From 1958 on, Northern and Southern Vietnamese combat troops also began to infiltrate the remote jungles of eastern Cambodia where they continued the Ho Chi Minh trail. The Cambodian communist insurgents had joined these sanctuaries during the late 1960s. Although co-operation took place, the Khmer communists did not adopt modern socialist doctrines and eventually allied with China.

The complete American withdrawal instantaneously eliminated the principal and common adversary of all the communist powers. The communist regimes of Cambodia, Vietnam and Laos pledged allegiance with one of these two opposing factions. The ensuing hostilities were fuelled by century-old animosities between Vietnam and Cambodia, and – particularly – Vietnam and China.

Vietnamese invasion of Cambodia

After the Fall of Saigon and Phnom Penh in April and May 1975 and the subsequent communist takeover in Laos five months later, Indochina was dominated by communist regimes. Armed border clashes between Cambodia and Vietnam soon flared up and escalated as Khmer Rouge forces advanced deep into Vietnamese territory and raided villages, killing hundreds of civilians. Vietnam counter attacked and in December 1978, NVA troops invaded Cambodia, reaching Phnom Penh in January 1979 and arriving at the Thai border in spring 1979.

However, as China, the U.S. and the majority of the international community opposed the Vietnamese campaign, the remaining Khmer Rouge managed to permanently settle in the Thai-Cambodian border region. In a United Nations Security Council meeting, seven non-aligned members drafted a resolution for a ceasefire and Vietnamese withdrawal which failed due to opposition from the Soviet Union and Czechoslovakia. Thailand tolerated the presence of the Khmer Rouge on its soil as they helped to contain the Vietnamese and Thai domestic guerillas. Over the course of the following decade, the Khmer Rouge received considerable support from Vietnam's enemies and served as a bargaining tool in the Realpolitik of Thailand, China, the ASEAN and the U.S.

Vietnamese-Thailand conflict
 
Khmer Rouge forces operated from inside Thai territory attacking the pro-Hanoi People's Republic of Kampuchea's government. Similarly Vietnamese forces frequently attacked the Khmer Rouge bases inside Thailand. Eventually Thai and Vietnamese regular troops clashed on several occasions during the following decade. The situation escalated as Thailand's territorial sovereignty was violated on numerous occasions. Heavy fighting with many casualties resulted from direct confrontations between Vietnamese and Thai troops. Thailand increased troop strength, purchased new equipment and built a diplomatic front against Vietnam.

Sino-Vietnamese conflicts

China attacked Vietnam in response to Vietnam's occupation of Cambodia, entered northern Vietnam and captured several cities near the border. On March 6, 1979, China declared that their punitive mission had been successful and withdrew from Vietnam. However, both China and Vietnam claimed victory. The fact that Vietnamese forces continued to stay in Cambodia for another decade implies that China's campaign was a strategic failure. On the other hand, the conflict had proven that China had succeeded in preventing effective Soviet support for its Vietnamese ally.

As forces remained mobilized, the Vietnamese Army and the Chinese People's Liberation Army engaged in another decade-long series of border disputes and naval clashes that lasted until 1990. These mostly local engagements usually wore out in prolonged stand-offs, as neither side achieved any long-term military gains. By the late 1980s the Vietnamese Communist Party's (VCP) began to adopt its Doi Moi (renovation) policy and reconsider its China policy in particular. Prolonged hostile relations with China had been recognized as to be detrimental to economic reforms, national security and the regime's survival. A number of political concessions opened the way for the normalization process of 1991.

Regional conflicts
 The Insurgency in Laos
 The Communist insurgency in Thailand
 The Thai–Laotian Border War
 The Johnson South Reef Skirmish
 The FULRO insurgency against Vietnam

See also
 First Indochina War
 Sino-Soviet split
 Vietnam War

Notes

References

 
1970s in Vietnam
1980s in Vietnam
1990s in Vietnam
Indochina03
Indochina
Indochina
Indochina03
3
Indochina
Indochina
Indochina
Indochina
Indochina
Indochina
Indochina